Angela Bernice Kent (born 6 February 1990) is an Australian television personality, known for appearing alongside Yvie Jones on Gogglebox Australia from 2015 to 2018.

Career
After leaving Gogglebox Australia in December 2018, it was announced that Kent and Yvie Jones would appear on the fifth season of I'm a Celebrity...Get Me Out of Here!, which began airing on 13 January 2019. Kent was the 10th celebrity to be eliminated from the show.

In 2019, Kent starred in the fifth season of The Bachelorette Australia. She also released a book, If You Don't Laugh You'll Cry.

Television

Controversies
In October 2021, Kent was fined $1200 and disqualified from driving for four months after pleading guilty to drink driving. Kent recorded a blood alcohol content of 0.081%. The sentencing magistrate noted that Kent had multiple driving offences, including a previous drink driving charge in 2014.

References

1990 births
Australian writers
Australian television personalities
Women television personalities
Living people
People from the Sunshine Coast, Queensland